This list of 2010 motorsport champions is a list of national or international auto racing series with championships decided by the points or positions earned by a driver from multiple races where the season was completed during the 2010 calendar year.

Open wheel racing

Karting

Dirt/Clay Oval racing

Sports car

Touring car racing

Truck racing

Rallying

Motorcycles

Road racing

Motorcycle speedway

Supermoto

Air racing

See also
 List of motorsport championships

References 

 Champions
2010